Rashk-e Sofla (also Romanized as Rashk-e Soflá and Rashk Soflá; also known as Rashk, Rashk-e Pā’īn, Rashksar, and Rask-i-Sar) is a village in Toghrol Al Jerd Rural District, Toghrol Al Jerd District, Kuhbanan County, Kerman Province, Iran. At the 2006 census, its population was 71, in 18 families.

References 

Populated places in Kuhbanan County